

Public Medicine
Health 
Prosperity#Synergistic notions of prosperity
Savanna principle
Socioeconomic status#Health
Sociology of health and illness

Country specific
Health in Mali
Social determinants of health in Mexico
Health care in the United States

Sociological
Satisfaction with Life Index, which shows a correlation to health and wealth

Theology
Prosperity theology

Determinants of health
Health economics
Social inequality